The Burnden Park disaster was a human crush that occurred on 9 March 1946 at Burnden Park football stadium, then the home of Bolton Wanderers. The crush resulted in the deaths of 33 people and injuries to hundreds of Bolton fans. It was the deadliest stadium-related disaster in British history until the Ibrox Park disaster in 1971.

The match, an FA Cup Sixth Round second-leg tie between Bolton and Stoke City, was allowed to continue, with the game ending goalless. The disaster brought about the Moelwyn Hughes report, which recommended more rigorous control of crowd sizes.

Disaster

It was estimated that the crowd was in excess of 85,000 people. Entrance to the Bolton end of the ground, which had no roof, was from the Manchester Road end only. The disaster happened at the Railway End of the ground where, in common with many other post-war grounds, facilities were rudimentary. The bank was crude, just dirt with odd flagstones for steps. Although there was room towards the Burnden side of the ground, part of the stand had been requisitioned by the Ministry of Supply and it had not yet been returned to normal use following the war. In addition, the turnstiles at the east end of the Railway Embankment which adjoined the Burnden Stand had been closed since 1940.

At the time, fans paid at the turnstiles rather than buy tickets beforehand. As a result, the end became packed and over capacity and it was decided to close the turnstiles at 2:40 pm. This, however, did not stop more people entering the ground, with people climbing in from the railway, climbing over the closed turnstiles and, when a locked gate was opened, entering through it. During the melee and such was the pressure from the railway end, that many fans were inexorably pushed along the side of the pitch, around the far end and eventually right out of the ground, ending up in the car park unable to watch the game.

Shortly after the game started, the crowd began spilling onto the pitch and the game was temporarily stopped as the pitch was cleared. However, at this time, two barriers collapsed and the crowd fell forward, crushing those underneath. The game was restarted but was quickly halted again when a Bolton Borough Police officer came onto the pitch to speak to the referee, George Dutton, to inform him there had been a fatality. He, in turn, called the two captains, Bolton's Harry Hubbick and Stoke's Neil Franklin, together to inform them and the players left the pitch.

The dead and injured were taken from the railway end terrace, with those who had died laid along the touchline and covered in coats. A little under half an hour after leaving the pitch, the game was restarted, with a new sawdust lined touchline separating the players from the corpses. At the end of the first-half, the players immediately changed ends and started the second half. Stanley Matthews was on the Stoke team, and later said he was sickened that the game was allowed to continue.

Aftermath
Moelwyn Hughes's official report recommended more rigorous control of crowd sizes. A conference on the licensing and regulation of sports grounds where it was recommended that, as a voluntary code, local authorities should inspect grounds with a capacity of 10,000 spectators and agreed safety limits should be in place for grounds of more than 25,000 capacity. Turnstiles should mechanically record spectator numbers and grounds should have internal telephone systems.

On 24 August 1946 England and Scotland drew 2–2 in an additional fixture in aid of the Disaster Fund. All tickets to the match at Maine Road, Manchester were sold raising £12,000 (2010: £). The Burnden Park disaster was the greatest tragedy in British football history until the Ibrox Park disaster at Rangers' home ground in 1971.

In 1992 a memorial plaque was unveiled at the stadium. In 2000, following the move by Bolton Wanderers to a new ground, the plaque was relocated to the wall of the supermarket which now occupies the site of the tragedy.

References

Sources

External links
Burnden Disaster
 Il disastro di Burnden Park (www.saladellamemoriaheysel.it)
 The Burnden Park Disaster: The Forgotten Tragedy
 Stoke City tribute at Merseyside Potters
 The Burnden Park Disaster: Examining The Sense Making Process of Football's Forgotten Tragedy

1946 disasters in the United Kingdom
1946 in England
1940s in Lancashire
Bolton Wanderers F.C.
Disasters in Lancashire
History of Bolton
History of football in England
Human stampedes in the 1940s
Human stampedes in the United Kingdom
March 1946 events in the United Kingdom
Stadium disasters
Stoke City F.C.